Carl Jaffe (21 March 1902 – 12 April 1974) was a German actor. Jaffe trained on the stage in his native Hamburg, Kassel and Wiesbaden before moving to Berlin, where his career began to develop.

In 1933 Jaffe changed his stage name to Frank Alwar, but in 1936, with the situation for Jews in Germany rapidly deteriorating, he made the decision to migrate to the United Kingdom. He remained in the UK for the rest of his life and appeared in more than 50 films and many television productions.

Throughout his British career he was often cast as German or Central European characters, usually in supporting roles, and often with a war, crime or espionage setting.  His film roles include The Lion Has Wings, The Life and Death of Colonel Blimp, Two Thousand Women, Operation Amsterdam and The Roman Spring of Mrs. Stone. Jaffe's television credits included Danger Man, Dad's Army and Oh, Brother!.

Partial filmography

 Second Best Bed (1938) - Georges Dubonnet
 Over the Moon (1939) - Michel
 The Silent Battle (1939) - Rykoff
 The Saint in London (1939) - Stengler
 The Lion Has Wings (1939) - Unnamed Character
 An Englishman's Home (1940) - Martin
 Law and Disorder (1940)
 Gasbags (1941) - Gestapo Chief
 Uncensored (1942) - Kohlmeier
 Squadron Leader X (1943) - Luftwaffe Colonel
 The Life and Death of Colonel Blimp (1943) - von Reumann
 Warn That Man (1943) - Schultz
 The Night Invader (1943) - Count von Biebrich
 Two Thousand Women (1944) - Sergt. Hentzner
 The Man from Morocco (1945) - German General
 I Didn't Do It (1945) - Hilary Vance
 Gaiety George (1946) - Kommandant
 Counterblast (1948) - Heinz
 The Blind Goddess (1948) - Johan Meyer
 I Was a Male War Bride (1949) - Jail Officer (uncredited)
 State Secret (1950) - Janovic Prada
 The Dancing Years (1950) - Headwaiter
 The Black Rose (1950) - Officer (uncredited)
 Lilli Marlene (1950) - Propaganda Chief
 A Tale of Five Cities (1951) - Charlotte's Brother
 Ivanhoe (1952) - Austrian Monk
 Appointment in London (1953) - German General
 Desperate Moment (1953) - Cellblock Guard Becker
 Park Plaza 605 (1953) - Boris Roff
 Betrayed (1954) - Major Plaaten (uncredited)
 Child's Play (1954) - Carl Blotz
 The Awakening (1954) - The Tailor
 Cross Channel (1955) - Otto Dagoff
 Timeslip (1955) - Dr. Marks (uncredited)
 Port of Escape (1956) - Ship's Officer
 Satellite in the Sky (1956) - Bechstein
 House of Secrets (1956) - Walter Dorffman
 The Hostage (1956) - Dr. Pablo Gonzuelo
 The Traitor (1957) - Stefan Toller
 Escapement (1958) - Dr. Hoff
 I Accuse! (1958) - Col. von Schwarzkoppen
 Battle of the V-1 (1958) - General
 Rockets Galore! (1958) - Dr. Hamburger
 Operation Amsterdam (1959) - Diamond Merchant
 First Man into Space (1959) - Dr. Paul von Essen
 Subway in the Sky (1959) - German Detective
 Man on a String (1960) - People's Judge
 Danger Man (TV, 1960) - Professor Barkoff
 The Roman Spring of Mrs. Stone (1961) - Baron Waldheim
 Doomsday at Eleven (1963) - Stefan
 Operation Crossbow (1965) - German Officer at Rocket Plant (uncredited) 
 Up Jumped a Swagman (1965) - Analyst
 The Double Man (1967) - Police Surgeon
 Battle Beneath the Earth (1967) - Dr. Galissi
 The Enemy Within the Gates (Dad's Army episode)(1968) - Captain Winogrodzki
 Fiddler on the Roof (1971) - Isaac (uncredited)

References

External links
 
 Carl Jaffe at BFI Film & TV Database

1902 births
1974 deaths
German male stage actors
German male film actors
German male television actors
Male actors from Hamburg
20th-century German male actors
Jewish emigrants from Nazi Germany to the United Kingdom